Marcel Gaston Fétique (born 1899 in Mirecourtdied 1977 in Paris) was a French archetier from a family of bowmakers.

Son of Victor Fétique (1872-1933), the family moved to Paris when he was two years  of age. He apprenticed with his father in his father's shop along with other makers such as his uncle Jules Fétique,  Thomassin, Toussain, Louis Morizot (1874-1957), Ewald Weidhaas (1869–1939) and his cousin André Richaume. He stamped his bows 'Mcel Fetique a Paris' at the butt of the bow.

His grandfather was Charles Claude Fétique (1853-1911) who was a violin maker, who had two bow-making sons, Victor Fétique (1872-1933) and Jules Fétique (1875-1951), and a daughter Marie Augustine Marthe Fétique (1879-1928 Andre's mother). Marcel's cousin André Richaume (1905 - 1966) became one of the great French bow makers of the 20th century. His early work is very close to his father's (at times it is difficult to tell them apart). Later, was inspired by Émile Auguste Ouchard. Marcel's work is well respected.

References

 
 
 
 Discovering bows for the Double Bass  1994 Beaux Arts Editions - Christopher Brown
 Dictionnaire Universel del Luthiers - René Vannes 1951,1972, 1985 (vol.3)
 Universal Dictionary of Violin & Bow Makers - William Henley 1970

1899 births
1977 deaths
Luthiers from Mirecourt
Bow makers